In mathematics, especially in order theory, the greatest element of a subset  of a partially ordered set (poset) is an element of  that is greater than every other element of . The term least element is defined dually, that is, it is an element of  that is smaller than every other element of

Definitions 

Let  be a preordered set and let  
An element  is said to be  if  and if it also satisfies: 
 for all 

Explicitly, an element  is said to be  if  and if it also satisfies: 
 for all  

If  is even a partially ordered set then  can have at most one greatest element and it can have at most one least element.

If  has a greatest element (resp. a least element) then this element is also called  (resp. ) of

Relationship to upper/lower bounds 

Greatest elements are closely related to upper bounds. 

Let  be a preordered set and let  

Even if a set has some upper bounds, it need not have a greatest element, as shown by the example of the negative real numbers. 
This example also demonstrates that the existence of a least upper bound (the number 0 in this case) does not imply the existence of a greatest element either.

Contrast to maximal elements and local/absolute maximums 

A greatest element of a subset of a preordered set should not be confused with a maximal element of the set, which are elements that are not strictly smaller than any other element in the set. 

Let  be a preordered set and let  
An element  is said to be a  if the following condition is satisfied:

whenever  satisfies  then necessarily  

If  is a partially ordered set then  is a maximal element of  if and only if there does  exist any  such that  and  
A  is defined to mean a maximal element of the subset  

A set can have several maximal elements without having a greatest element. 
Like upper bounds and maximal elements, greatest elements may fail to exist. 

In a totally ordered set the maximal element and the greatest element coincide; and it is also called maximum; in the case of function values it is also called the absolute maximum, to avoid confusion with a local maximum. 
The dual terms are minimum and absolute minimum. 
Together they are called the absolute extrema. 
Similar conclusions hold for least elements.

Role of (in)comparability in distinguishing greatest vs. maximal elements

One of the most important differences between a greatest element  and a maximal element  of a preordered set  has to do with what elements they are comparable to. 
Because preorders are reflexive (which means that  is true for all elements ), every element  is always comparable to itself. 
Consequently, the only pairs of elements that could possibly be incomparable are  pairs.  
In general, however, preordered sets (and even directed partially ordered sets) may have elements that are incomparable. 

By definition, an element  is a greatest element of  if  for every ; so by its very definition, a greatest element of  must, in particular, be comparable to  element in  
This is not required of maximal elements. 
This is because unlike the definition of "greatest element", the definition of "maximal element" includes an important  statement. 

Example where all elements are maximal but none are greatest

Consequently,  can not possibly have a greatest element (because a greatest element of  would, in particular, have to be comparable to  element of  but  has no such element). 

However, the uniqueness conclusion is no longer guaranteed if the preordered set  is  also partially ordered. 

Properties 

Throughout, let  be a partially ordered set and let  
 A set  can have at most  greatest element. Thus if a set has a greatest element then it is necessarily unique.
 Thus if a set  has several maximal elements then it cannot have a greatest element.
 If  satisfies the ascending chain condition, a subset  of  has a greatest element if, and only if, it has one maximal element.
 However, this is not a necessary condition for whenever  has a greatest element, the notions coincide, too, as stated above. 
 If the notions of maximal element and greatest element coincide on every two-element subset  of  then  is a total order on

Sufficient conditions 
 A finite chain always has a greatest and a least element.

Top and bottom 

The least and greatest element of the whole partially ordered set play a special role and are also called bottom (⊥) and top (⊤), or zero (0) and unit (1), respectively.
If both exist, the poset is called a bounded poset.
The notation of 0 and 1 is used preferably when the poset is a complemented lattice, and when no confusion is likely, i.e. when one is not talking about partial orders of numbers that already contain elements 0 and 1 different from bottom and top.
The existence of least and greatest elements is a special completeness property of a partial order.

Further introductory information is found in the article on order theory.

Examples 

 The subset of integers has no upper bound in the set  of real numbers.
 Let the relation  on  be given by     The set  has upper bounds  and  but no least upper bound, and no greatest element (cf. picture).
 In the rational numbers, the set of numbers with their square less than 2 has upper bounds but no greatest element and no least upper bound.
 In  the set of numbers less than 1 has a least upper bound, viz. 1, but no greatest element.
 In  the set of numbers less than or equal to 1 has a greatest element, viz. 1, which is also its least upper bound.
 In  with the product order, the set of pairs  with  has no upper bound.
 In  with the lexicographical order, this set has upper bounds, e.g.  It has no least upper bound.

See also 

 Essential supremum and essential infimum
 Initial and terminal objects
 Maximal and minimal elements
 Limit superior and limit inferior (infimum limit)
 Upper and lower bounds

Notes

References 

 

Order theory
Superlatives